Cliff (Clifton) Nye is an Indigenous Australian Lebanese professional rugby league footballer who has played as a  or  for the Auburn Warriors in the Ron Massey Cup. 

He played for Wentworthville Magpies in the Ron Massey and NSW Cup.

He was also a Junior Canterbury Bulldogs under 18s SG Ball Representative and under 20s Toyota Cup Representative Canterbury Bulldogs.

Nye is a Lebanese international, selected and toured Europe in the 2013 RUGBY LEAGUE WORLD CUP - EUROPE GAMES.

References

Rugby league centres
Rugby league fullbacks
Lebanese rugby league players
Lebanon national rugby league team players
Living people
Year of birth missing (living people)